Holland's Next Top Model (often abbreviated as HNTM and previously subtitled Modelmasters: Holland's Next Top Model from 2006 to 2007, signifying the show's partnership with the agency) is a Dutch reality television series, produced by Endemol, based on Tyra Banks' America's Next Top Model. The series began airing in November 2006 on RTL 5, and has enjoyed a fair amount of success in the years since its inception. It has been relatively effective in its mission to find new talent, most notably with discoveries like those of cycle 4 contestant and finalist Patricia van der Vliet, cycle 5 winner Tamara Weijenberg and cycle 7 runner up Sanne De Roo.

History and background

The first cycle of the show, which featured 10 contestants, was hosted by model Yfke Sturm, with a panel consisting of Dutch photographer and artistic director Carli Hermès, journalist and editor Karin Swerink, and presenter Rosalie van Breemen. The first winner of the series was 19 year-old Sanne Nijhof, who also went on to win the Ford Models Supermodel of the World contest in 2007. Daphne Deckers replaced Sturm as the host of the show in 2007.

Benelux' Next Top Model
Following the conclusion of the series' fourth cycle in 2008, production began on a joint adaptation of the show with neighboring Belgium. The new show was titled Benelux' Next Top Model, but despite the Benelux reference in the title, the program was not broadcast in Luxembourg or Wallonia, and did not feature contestants from Luxembourg. After a two-season run, producers of the show abandoned the concept, opting to work on independent cycles again instead. The first cycle following the merger began airing in 2011. Three of the five panel members from the last cycle of Benelux' Next Top Model, including host Daphne Deckers, Bastiaan van Schaik, and Mariana Verkerk returned to the newly independent production, as did many other staff and crew members of the show. The two winners of Benelux' Next Top Model, Rosalinde Kikstra and Melissa Baas, were also included among the show's past winners on its official website. After a short hiatus in 2012, Anouk Smulders replaced Deckers as the host of the show.

Post BnlxNTM

While the series had initially followed the format of the American version of the show, it later began adding some alterations. This included the adoption of a non-linear call-out from cycles 6-9, much like that of Heidi Klum's Germany's Next Top Model, though the show has recently reverted to linear rankings during eliminations. In cycle 11, they worked with a linear judging system again where the judges could vote 'yes' or 'no'. The models with the most 'no', were in the bottom of that week. Overseas they got rid of the system.

In 2015, the show crowned the first openly transgender contestant in the history of the franchise when Loiza Lamers was chosen as the winner of the eighth cycle by the Dutch public.

In 2016, social media and public voting were important aspects. In the last 3 episodes, all the eliminations were determined by public voting during live episodes. During the live finale, the previously eliminated model with the best social media skills would make a come back in the competition. Colette Kanza who originally ended 6th came back, and ended as runner-up.

In 2017, it was announced that the show would begin allowing the participation of male contestants, becoming the 11th adaptation in the franchise to convert to a co-ed show since 2013. The current judging panel consists of fashion blogger and model Anna Nooshin, stylist JeanPaul Paula, former America's Next Top Model panelist Nigel Barker, and cycle 2 winner Kim Feenstra.

In 2019, there  were 2 model houses. The models lived separately without knowing of each other's existence. After a few episodes, the 2 houses merged.

In 2022, Loiza Lamers replaced Anna Nooshin as host.

Show format
Each cycle of Holland's Next Top Model consists of 8–16 episodes and begins with about 10–16 contestants. Each episode one contestant is eliminated, though there have been several cases where a double elimination takes place, or more rarely, a non-elimination by consensus of the judging panel. In most cycles of the show, the first elimination is often unceremonious, with the first eliminated contestant(s) being eliminated outside of judging panel.

Makeovers are administered to contestants early in the cycle, and at least one trip to an international destination is scheduled sometime during filming. Each episode covers roughly about one week of real time, though this varies. Episodes are divided into several segments, generally featuring a fashion challenge, photo shoot or commercial, judging, and critique of each contestant and her performance by the judging panel. Each episode is usually associated with a theme in the world of modeling, such as dealing with the press in interviews, selling a commercial product, appearing in a runway show or going on castings.

Challenges and photo shoots 
Each episode usually begins with the contestants receiving training in an area concurrent with the week's theme. For example, contestants may get coached in runway walking, improvisational acting, or applying make-up to suit various occasions. A related challenge soon follows, such as a mock runway show or interview, and a winner is chosen by a judge. They receive a prize, such as clothing, a night out, or an advantage at the next photo shoot, and they are usually allowed to share the benefits with a certain number of other contestants of their choice. The next segment is a photo shoot, and each contestant's performance will reflect heavily on their judging for that week. Usually, one photo shoot per season is replaced with a commercial shoot.

Judging and elimination
The final segment of each episode is judging. Each contestant's photo is evaluated by the judging panel. After all the photos have been evaluated, the contestants leave the room as the judges deliberate. The elimination process is ceremonious, as the host hands out photos to the safe contestants one by one, in order of merit. The bottom two contestants are called forward for criticism before it is revealed which of the two has been eliminated. In later years of the show, the structure of eliminations became much less rigid, adopting instead a format similar to that of shows like Project Runway. In contrast to the American version of the show, the final episode of each cycle features the last three or four contestants competing in a live finale.

Judges

Guest jury member 
In season 1, 2 and 5, the 5th spot in judging panel was taken by a guest jury member. In season 3, there was only a guest judge added in episode 5. In the first five seasons, a main judge could be replaced with the mentor or a make-up/styling coach of that season in some episodes. In season 6, 7 and 8 the 4th spot in the judging panel was also a guest.

In the twelfth season in 2019, there were several well-known guest jury members such as Famke Louise and Loiza Lamers who supported the permanent jury.

Cycles

See also
Benelux' Next Top Model

References

External links 
Official site

 
2006 Dutch television series debuts
2011 Dutch television series endings
2013 Dutch television series debuts
Dutch television series based on American television series
RTL 5 original programming